Noble Township is one of fourteen townships in Cass County, Indiana. As of the 2010 census, its population was 1,960.

History
Noble Township was organized in 1836. It was named for Noah Noble, fifth Governor of Indiana.

Geography

Cities and towns
 Logansport (west edge)

Unincorporated towns
 Verona
(This list is based on USGS data and may include former settlements.)

Adjacent townships
 Harrison (north)
 Bethlehem (northeast)
 Clay (east)
 Eel (southeast)
 Clinton (southwest)
 Jefferson (west)
 Boone (northwest)

Major highways
  U.S. Route 24
  U.S. Route 35
  Indiana State Road 17

Cemeteries
The township contains three cemeteries: East Sand Ridge, Harper and Horney.

References
 United States Census Bureau cartographic boundary files
 U.S. Board on Geographic Names

External links

 Indiana Township Association
 United Township Association of Indiana

Townships in Cass County, Indiana
Townships in Indiana
1836 establishments in the United States
Populated places established in 1836